Trygve Wiese-Haugland (born 15 March 1985), known by his stage name Wiese (sometimes stylized WIESE, pronounced 'vi:se'), is a Norwegian music producer, DJ and songwriter.

Wiese makes commercial electronic music, often in the style of electro house and slap house.

In 2019, Wiese caught the attention of Warner Music Norway, which released Wiese's single 'VIKING'. The song was a hit in Norway, reaching the top of several national playlists, including Spotify's 'Norway Viral 50'. It is also the most played Norwegian football song of all time. Wiese made the song with his fellow producer and friend, Joakim Harestad Haukaas aka kid joki, who has worked with artists like Zara Larsson, Britney Spears and Seeb.

Wiese's songs have frequently been featured on the largest Spotify editorial lists.

Wiese first entered the public scene in 2004 through the single 'Me e Viking' which was first performed in the opening ceremony of Viking Stadion, 1 May 2004. This performance made Wiese the first artist ever to perform at the Viking Stadion. Since then, he has performed at a number of arenas, including the historic Rockefeller Music Hall in Oslo.

In 2005, the official music video of 'Me e Viking' was first broadcast on Norwegian National TV and in 2005, 2006 and 2007 it was the most played music video on NRK, the Norwegian government-owned TV company. In 2008 it was awarded the 'Best Viking FK Song Of All Time' by the magazine Kick and Viking FK.

Discography

Singles 

 «Find Myself» (2021)
 «Loyal» (2020)
 «Somebody Else» (2020)
 «Never Let Me Go» (2020)
 «I Fell» (2020)
 «How Can I Live» (2020)
«The Lion Sleeps Tonight» (2019)
«VIKING» (2019)
«Giv Akt» (2005)
«Me e Viking» (2004)
«Gullguttar på ny» (2003)

Official music videos 

«VIKING» (2019)
«The Lion Sleeps Tonight» (2019)
«Me e Viking» (2004)

Albums 
«Ingen banke oss på Stadion» (2008)
 «Vikingtiå e tebage» (2004)

EP 
«No Way EP» (2006)

External links
Wiese on Instagram
Wiese on Spotify
Wiese on YouTube
Wiese on Facebook
Wiese on Twitter

References

1985 births
Living people
Norwegian pop singers
Musicians from Stavanger
21st-century Norwegian singers
21st-century Norwegian male singers